China Lee (born Margaret Lee; September 2, 1942) is an American model and actress. She was Playboy's  Playmate of the Month for the August 1964 issue, and the first Asian American Playmate. Her centerfold was photographed by Pompeo Posar. According to her Playmate profile, her name is pronounced "chee-na" to rhyme with "Tina".

Early life
Lee was born in New Orleans, Louisiana, to Chinese parents who had immigrated to the United States after their marriage. The family owned a laundry and later a much lauded restaurant. She is the youngest of eight children and the younger sister of Harry Lee, who served as the sheriff of Jefferson Parish, Louisiana for about 28 years. The name "China" is derived from the nickname "Chinita" ("little Chinese girl") bestowed on her by Spanish-speaking neighbors who admired her dancing as a child.

Career
Lee worked as a hairstylist and waitress, then as a Playboy Club Bunny, before appearing in Playboy. She had been a "Training Bunny," which required her to travel to different Playboy Clubs to teach prospective Bunnies their duties.

Lee appeared at the end of Woody Allen's What's Up, Tiger Lily?, performing a striptease.

Personal life
Lee married comedian Mort Sahl in 1967.  They divorced in 1991.  Their only child, Mort Sahl, Jr. died on March 27, 1996, at the age of 19.

References

External links
 
 

1942 births
Living people
American Playboy Playmates of Asian descent
American people of Chinese descent
Actresses from New Orleans
1960s Playboy Playmates
Äva Records artists
21st-century American women